Huaneng Qinbei Power Station is a large coal-fired power station in China owned by Huaneng Power International.

See also 

 List of coal power stations
 List of power stations in China

References

External links 
 Huaneng Qinbei power station on Global Energy Monitor

Coal-fired power stations in China
China Huaneng Group
Jiyuan
Buildings and structures in Henan